The Shadow Ministry of John Hewson was the opposition Coalition shadow ministry of Australia from 11 April 1990 to 23 May 1994, opposing the Australian Labor Party's Hawke–Keating government.

The shadow cabinet is a group of senior Opposition spokespeople who form an alternative Cabinet to the government's, whose members shadow or mark each individual Minister or portfolio of the Government.

John Hewson became Leader of the Opposition upon his election as leader of the Liberal Party on 3 April 1990, and appointed his first Shadow Cabinet. He appointed a second, rearranged Shadow Cabinet after losing the 1993 election.

First arrangement

Shadow Cabinet
The following were members of the Shadow Cabinet:

Outer shadow ministry

Second arrangement 
The Shadow Ministry was rearranged following the 1993 election.

Shadow Cabinet

Outer shadow ministry

See also
 Shadow Ministry of Alexander Downer
 Fourth Hawke Ministry
 First Keating Ministry
 Second Keating Ministry

References

Liberal Party of Australia
National Party of Australia
Hewson
Opposition of Australia